Ronald Alejandro Ramírez MacKay (born 14 January 1975) better known as Ronald MacKay or simply MacKay  is a Guatemalan YouTuber and voice actor.

References

External links 
 
 

Living people
1975 births
Gaming YouTubers
Guatemalan YouTubers
Spanish-language YouTubers
Twitch (service) streamers
YouTube channels launched in 2012
YouTube vloggers
Video bloggers